The eMac (short for education Mac) is a discontinued all-in-one Mac desktop computer that was produced and designed by Apple Computer Released in 2002, it was originally aimed at the education market, but was later made available as a cheaper mass-market alternative to Apple's second-generation LCD iMac G4. The eMac was pulled from retail on October 12, 2005, and was again sold exclusively to educational institutions thereafter. It was discontinued by Apple on July 5, 2006, and replaced by a cheaper, low-end iMac G5 that, like the eMac, was exclusively sold to educational institutions.

The eMac design closely resembles the first-generation iMac, though the eMac is white, slightly larger in size, and heavier than the preceding G3, weighing .The unique shape of the computer was also similar to the 17-inch CRT Studio Display from 2000 (the last standalone CRT monitor Apple made). The Apple eMac features a PowerPC 7450 (G4e) processor that is significantly faster than the previous-generation PowerPC 750 (G3) processor, as well as a 17-inch flat CRT display, which was aimed at the education market, as LCD screens would be expensive.

Background
In 1998, Apple released the iMac G3, an all-in-one computer built around a cathode-ray tube display. The iMac was a major success for Apple, selling more than five million units; it also sold for as low as US$799, making it the most affordable Mac model Apple offered. In January 2002, Apple announced a successor to the iMac G3, the iMac G4. This iMac was built around a floating flat-panel display, and started at a higher price than the previous generation. While a few models of the iMac G3 remained at lower price points, they lacked power for educational tasks like video. Education customers made up nearly a quarter of Apple's sales, and with Windows-based computers eating into Apple's market share of the sector, Apple consulted with educators to build a cheaper G4-powered successor for the price-conscious market.

Apple announced the eMac on April 29, 2002, to be sold only to education markets. Apple had previously created education-only computer models, including the iMac predecessor Power Macintosh G3 All-In-One. The machine's CRT screen made it cheaper than the iMac (the most expensive configuration was still cheaper than the cheapest iMac G4), and its bulk was intended to make it more resilient to wear and tear in a school setting than the fragile hinge and flat screen of the iMac.

Design and release 

The eMac had a substantially similar design to the iMac G3, but featured a larger  (16-inch viewable) flat-screen CRT monitor. The larger screen offered 40percent more viewing area than the iMac. The computer was powered by a PowerPC G4 processor much faster than the G3-powered iMacs. The machine's serial number and networking identification were printed on the front of the computer behind the optical drive door to make it easier for schools to track purchases. RAM could be upgraded through a service hatch at the bottom of the computer. Apple sold a separate tilt-and-swivel stand to enable changing the viewing angle of the screen.

Release
After complaints from customers, Apple announced the eMac would be available through general retail on month later. Regular consumers did not get the same prices and configuration options as education customers; for example, education buyers could get a model without a modem.

The eMac generally catered to the mass market, eventually taking over the entry-level (previously held by the iMac G3) Macintosh from 2003 to 2005, while the iMac G4 was positioned as a premium offering throughout the lifetime of the eMac line. The eMac generally offered similar performance and features to the iMac G4 while they were sold side by side. The eMac was gradually supplanted by the iMac G5 in 2005 to 2006.

In October 2003, 800 MHz model was eliminated as a standard configuration and the 1 GHz model was brought down in price. This revision was the last in the line to officially run Apple's OS 9 operating system natively.

The next revision to the eMac line came in April 2004, with DDR SDRAM, a faster processor running at 1.25 GHz, and a better ATI Radeon 9200 video chipset. The most recent revision came in May 2005, with an even faster CPU running at 1.42 GHz, Radeon 9600 graphics, and larger standard hard disk.

On October 12, 2005, Apple once again restricted sales of the eMac to educational institutions and returned to its "E is for Education" marketing plan that had been attached to the product from the original restriction to education buyers. The company re-implemented this restrictive measure for unspecified reasons. Some analysts believe Apple wanted to force the general public to purchase the more expensive Mac Mini or iMac which had higher profit margins. Also, the eMac was the only CRT display product left in Apple's lineup which made it somewhat bulky compared to new offerings which had compact form factors due to their LCD screens. The falling cost of LCD displays would also gradually bring down the prices of the iMac G5. However, the eMac was still available for sale to the general public through some third-party retailer websites.

On July 5, 2006, the entire eMac line was discontinued. An "educational configuration" of the iMac Core Duo was introduced that same day, which has a Combo drive rather than a SuperDrive and a smaller hard disk of 80 GB.

Early eMac models natively boot Mac OS 9.2.2 and Mac OS X beginning with OS X 10.1.4, while later models only officially boot Mac OS X. 1 GHz and faster models cannot boot OS 9, while eMacs slower than 1 GHz do not officially support 10.5 (requirements are an 867 MHz G4 with 512 MB RAM).

Reception
The eMac was generally well-received. Macworlds Jason Snell wrote that the eMac served as a worthy successor to the iMac G3. Criticism of the initial release version was that the low amount of installed RAM (128MB) was not sufficient for Mac OS X.

Technical problems
A number of early eMac machines have suffered from what was known as "Raster Shift", a phenomenon where the bottom third or half of the screen goes black, with the rest of image shifting upward and beyond the top boundary of the display. Serious static also accompanies the problem, rendering the viewable part of the screen virtually useless. In response to the problem, Apple offered a solution which involved the replacement of the video cable inside the eMac's case.
Certain models of eMac also suffered from capacitor plague, that caused video distortion or the computer to lock up. Apple responded to these issues by implementing a warranty extension program.

Technical specifications 
All are standard configurations from Apple unless otherwise noted

Timeline of eMac models

Notes

References

External links

 eMac Specifications
 Everymac Specs Archive
 Apple Introduces low cost Education Configuration for 17-inch iMac
 eMac Upgrade Guide via Internet Archive

Macintosh all-in-ones
Macintosh computers by product line
PowerPC Macintosh computers
Sealed computers
Macintosh case designs
Computer-related introductions in 2002
Educational hardware